The 2011–12 season was PFC CSKA Sofia's 64th consecutive season in A Group. This article shows player statistics and all matches (official and friendly) that the club will play during the 2011–12 season.

Players

Squad stats 
Appearances for competitive matches only

|-
|colspan="14"|Players sold or loaned out after the start of the season:

|}
As of 23 May 2012

Players in/out

Summer transfers 

In:

Out:

Winter transfers 

In:

Out:

Pre-season and friendlies

1 The match was interrupted at 82nd minute due a mass brawl between both teams and officials.

Competitions

A Group

Table

Results summary

Results by round

Fixtures and results

Bulgarian Cup 

CSKA advanced to the third round.

CSKA advanced to the quarterfinals.

CSKA is eliminated from the competition.

Bulgarian Super Cup 

By winning in the 2010–11 Bulgarian Cup, CSKA Sofia will play against the 2010–11 Bulgarian champions Litex Lovech for the Supercup.

Europa League 

By winning in the 2010–11 Bulgarian Cup, CSKA Sofia qualified for the Europa League. They started in the play-off round.

Steaua București won 3–1 on aggregate and thus CSKA is eliminated from the competition.

UEFA Club Rankings
This is the current UEFA Club Rankings, including season 2010–11.

See also 

PFC CSKA Sofia

References

External links 
CSKA Official Site
CSKA Fan Page with up-to-date information
Bulgarian A Professional Football Group
UEFA Profile

PFC CSKA Sofia seasons
Cska Sofia
CSKA Sofia